Neerav Bavlecha is an Indian professional dancer and choreographer.  He judged popular Malayalam dance reality series titled D 4 Dance.

Personal life and career 
Neerav Bavlecha was born on 16 August in Ahmedabad, Gujarat. His immediate family consists of his parents and his elder sister. He received his schooling from Swami Vivekanand International School, Mumbai. He is graduated in Economics. His forte is lyrical contemporary. His guru in dance is Terence Lewis. He was one of the participants of Dance India Dance Season 3 and were too seen as the team skipper of Neerav Ke Ninjas of DID Li'l Masters Season 2 on Zee TV. In 2010-11, Neerav was seen as the choreo partner of Ragini Khanna who was the contestant of Jhalak Dikhhla Jaa Season 4 on Sony Entertainment Television and bagged the 6th position.

Neerav is essayed the permanent judge of the three seasons of Malayalam dance reality D 4 Dance series. Currently he is judging the fourth season of D 4 Dance series titled as D4 junior vs senior on Mazhavil manorama along with Priya Mani and Mamta Mohandas.

Choreography

Television

Films
2016- Daffadar (film) (Malayalam) - DEBUT

References

Living people
Indian male dancers
Indian film choreographers
Indian dance teachers
Participants in Indian reality television series
Dance India Dance
Indian choreographers
Contemporary dance choreographers
Contemporary dancers
Dancers from Gujarat
Year of birth missing (living people)